The Jollie River is a river of New Zealand's Southern Alps.

See also 
 List of rivers of New Zealand

References 

Rivers of Canterbury, New Zealand
Rivers of New Zealand